Denzil Holles may refer to:

 Denzil Holles (MP) (c. 1538 – 1590) MP for East Retford
 Denzil Holles, 1st Baron Holles (1599–1680), English statesman and writer
 Denzil Holles, 3rd Baron Holles (1675 – c. 1692), English statesman